The Bangalore Theological Forum is a biannual peer-reviewed academic journal established in 1967 by the Division of Research and Postgraduate Studies of United Theological College, Bangalore during the tenure of then Principal, Joshua Russell Chandran. The journal has been indexed in American Theological Library Association and found in nearly 150 library holdings worldwide.

References

Academic journals of India
English-language journals
Religious studies journals
Biannual journals
Publications established in 1967
Senate of Serampore College (University)
1967 establishments in Mysore State